Anatoly Nazarenko (born 19 December 1948 in Alma-Ata) is a Kazakhstani former wrestler who competed in the 1972 Summer Olympics.

References

External links
 

1948 births
Living people
Sportspeople from Almaty
Olympic wrestlers of the Soviet Union
Wrestlers at the 1972 Summer Olympics
Kazakhstani male sport wrestlers
Olympic silver medalists for the Soviet Union
Olympic medalists in wrestling
Soviet male sport wrestlers
Medalists at the 1972 Summer Olympics
Honoured Masters of Sport of the USSR